Ilan Chester (born Ilan Czenstochowski) is a celebrated Venezuelan musician, singer, songwriter and record producer. Born in Jaffa, Tel Aviv, Israel in 1952, to Ashkenazi parents, Ilan emigrated to Venezuela in 1953.

Biography 
2010 award winning Latin Grammy, Israeli-born and Venezuelan-raised Ilan Chester is a multi-talented musician, singer and composer with more than 35 music productions who has incorporated a global range of influences into his music. Chester grew up with the Jewish, French and Italian melodies he heard as a child at home and later he was equally enamored with American R&B ( Ray Charles, Stevie Wonder) and the British rock movement ( Beatles, Yes, Jethro Tull ).

At the age of 19, in 1971 he first met Hare Krishna devotees and two years later he was initiated and given the spiritual name Havi Das by his spiritual master A.C. Bhaktivedanta Swami Prabhupada. Chester has stated on record that 'Krishna consciousness is and has always been my true source of inspiration. It is the love found in the hearts of the devotees for Krishna that has motivated me to write songs.' He and his family continue to be active practitioners of the Vaishnava Bhakti tradition.

His music has grown to include elements of Classical Music, Jazz, Afro-Caribbean, and Venezuelan Folk music. A former member of rock and pop bands like "Trams", "Way" and "Melao", Ilan has also recorded four productions for the English speaking market. Chester became famous as an exceptional artist in Venezuela and all over Latin America since launching his solo career in 1983 filling up massive auditoriums and theaters.
After a series of memorable albums, including " Amistad", " Solo faltas tu", "ASI", "Songs Books of Venezuelan Love", Vols. 1, 2 & 3, he attracted even more international attention with the platinum-selling album "Navideno Heart" and a 6 CD collection where he has sold more than 500.000 units in just few weeks only in Venezuela. 
Ilan Chester is recognized everywhere by artist and critics alike as one of the most talented composer and singer in Spanish language. Many of his songs became international hits by Latin stars like Mark Anthony, Cheo Feliciano and Chayenne and he has followers all around the globe.

Discography

Compilation

References

External links 

Discography
iTunes
Asi, Album (2005) at Amazon.com

1952 births
Israeli emigrants to Venezuela
Israeli people of Polish-Jewish descent
Living people
People from Jaffa
Venezuelan Ashkenazi Jews
Converts to Hinduism from Judaism
Venezuelan Hindus
Venezuelan musicians
Venezuelan people of Polish-Jewish descent
Latin Grammy Award winners
Latin music songwriters
Latin Grammy Lifetime Achievement Award winners